Baidu Music is a Chinese music streaming service by Baidu. By December 2015, it had 150 million monthly active users.

History

In December 2015, Baidu announced that they merged Baidu Music with the record company Taihe Music Group, which owned the copyrights to 700,000 at the time and had licenses with overseas record labels; this allowed Baidu to include more songs within their streaming service. In May 2017, James Lu left Baidu Music.

Copyright infringement
In 2008, record companies Universal Music, as well as the Hong Kong divisions of Sony BMG Music Entertainment, and Warner Bros. Records, brought Baidu to court in China for allegedly linking to unauthorized copies of music with their music search engine. 

The record companies lost the case. Later, in 2011, Baidu signed contracts with record companies that allowed them to receive compensation when a user downloads or streams a song; advertisements on the service's website helped pay for the songs' licensing fees without making Baidu's music search engine a paid-for service.

References

External links
Baidu Music Site
Symphony Player
Hitsound Website

Music streaming services